Boac may refer to:

 Boac, Marinduque, a municipality in the central Philippines
 British Overseas Airways Corporation, abbreviated as BOAC, a former British state-owned airline